1848  in archaeology

Explorations
 First scientific expedition visits Tikal

Excavations

Publications
 Ancient Monuments of the Mississippi Valley by Ephraim George Squier and Edwin Hamilton Davis
 First volume of Austen H. Layard's Nineveh and its Remains
 Final volume of Lord Kingsborough's 9 volume Antiquities of Mexico

Finds
 By March 3 - Gibraltar 1, a female skull from Forbes' Quarry in Gibraltar, later identified as Neanderthal, is found by Capt. Edmund Flint RN
 May 3 - Benty Grange helmet from a tumulus on Benty Grange farm in the Peak District of England
 Neolithic hoard at East Ayton in England

Awards

Miscellaneous

Births

Deaths

References

See also
 List of years in archaeology
 1847 in archaeology
 1849 in archaeology

1848 archaeological discoveries
Archaeology by year
Archaeology